Khebda is a rural locality (a selo) and the administrative center of Shamilsky District of the Republic of Dagestan, Russia. Population: 

Until 1994, it was known as Sovetskoye.

References
 

Rural localities in Shamilsky District